Birds described in 1873 include the white-browed tit-warbler, Bartlett's tinamou, Von Schrenck's bittern, Raggiana bird-of-paradise, spangled coquette, Sangihe hanging parrot and the white-crowned penduline tit.

Events
Death of Jules Verreaux
Nuttall Ornithological Club founded.

Publications
Nikolai Severtzov (1873). "Vertical and Horizontal Distribution of Turkestan Wildlife" Proceedings of the Imperial Society of Amateurs of Natural Sciences, Anthropology and Ethnography of Moscow. 8 (2). p 270. 
Philip Sclater & Osbert Salvin (1873). Nomenclator avium neotropicalium: sive avium quae in regione neotropica hucusque repertae sunt nomina systematice disposita adjecta sua cuique speciei patria accedunt generum et specierum novarum diagnoses. London: Sumptibus Auctorum. J. W. Elliot. viii + 163pp. via the Biodiversity Heritage Library.
Paolo Savi Ornitologia Italiana Firenze :Successori Le Monnier,1873-1876. (opera posthuma 1873–1876) BHL
Elliott Coues 1873. Some United States birds, new to science, and other things ornithological. The American Naturalist 7: 321–331.

Ongoing events
Theodor von Heuglin Ornithologie von Nordost-Afrika (Ornithology of Northeast Africa) (Cassel, 1869–1875)
John Gould The Birds of Asia 1850-83 7 vols. 530 plates, Artists: J. Gould, H. C. Richter, W. Hart and J. Wolf; Lithographers: H. C. Richter and W. Hart
Henry Eeles Dresser and Richard Bowdler Sharpe  A History of the Birds of Europe, Including all the Species Inhabiting the Western Palearctic Region.Taylor & Francis of Fleet Street, London
The Ibis

References

1873
Birding and ornithology by year